Mark Jeffrey Hominick (born July 22, 1982) is a Canadian retired mixed martial artist who competed in the Featherweight division for the Ultimate Fighting Championship where he was the inaugural Featherweight title challenger, the WEC, and Affliction. He is also a former TKO Featherweight Champion. He was well known for his outstanding boxing skills and very accurate punching techniques, often utilizing the jab.

Background
As a teen he attended Ingersoll District Collegiate Institute. He was trained by the late MMA striking coach Shawn Tompkins with Sam Stout at The Adrenaline Training Center in London, Ontario, where he also works as an instructor. Nowadays he owns the training center along with Stout and Chris Horodecki.

Mixed martial arts career

Ultimate Fighting Championship
Hominick made his UFC debut against former top lightweight Yves Edwards at UFC 58. Hominick defeated Edwards via triangle choke in the second round.

Hominick next fought BJJ black belt Jorge Gurgel at UFC Ultimate Fight Night 5. He won by unanimous decision.

World Extreme Cagefighting
Hominick lost his first two WEC bouts back to back with first round submission losses to Rani Yahya and Josh Grispi at WEC 28 and WEC 32 respectively.

He was scheduled to fight Deividas Taurosevičius on October 10, 2009 at WEC 43., but was forced to withdraw due to an injury and was replaced by Javier Vazquez.

Hominick was scheduled to face Yves Jabouin on January 10, 2010 at WEC 46, but Jabouin was forced off the card with an injury. Hominick instead faced WEC newcomer Bryan Caraway, winning via first round submission.

The fight eventually took place on June 20, 2010 at WEC 49. Hominick won via TKO in the second round. They both won a Sherdog award for best round of 2010.

Hominick faced Leonard Garcia on September 30, 2010 at WEC 51. He won the fight via split decision.

Return to UFC
On October 28, 2010, World Extreme Cagefighting merged with the Ultimate Fighting Championship. As part of the merger, all WEC fighters were transferred to the UFC.

Hominick faced former training partner, George Roop on January 22, 2011 at UFC Fight Night 23 in a top contender bout. Hominick stopped Roop via punches in the first round.

Hominick faced UFC Featherweight Champion José Aldo on April 30, 2011 at UFC 129, where he lost via unanimous decision (48–45, 48–46, and 49–46) in a bout that earned Fight of the Night honors.

Hominick faced Chan Sung Jung on December 10, 2011 at UFC 140. Hominick attempted to recklessly attack Jung immediately after touching gloves and was dropped with a counter right. Jung followed up with punches until Hominick went limp and the referee brought an end to the fight, tying one of the fastest KOs in the UFC.

Hominick faced Eddie Yagin on April 21, 2012 at UFC 145. Hominick lost the fight via split decision, in a bout that earned both participants Fight of the Night honors.

Hominick faced Pablo Garza on November 17, 2012 at UFC 154.
He lost the fight by unanimous decision.

After the loss at UFC 154, Hominick announced his retirement on December 11, 2012, stating "I truly got to live my passion and follow my dreams by competing in mixed martial arts, especially under the Zuffa banner, but UFC 154, that's the last fight I'll be in the octagon, as I'm retiring and looking to move on to the next phase of my career."

Personal life
Hominick attended I.D.C.I school in Ingersoll, Ontario. Hominick married in December 2009. They have two children.

Mark Hominick has been involved with several other UFC fighters (Sean Pierson, Sam Stout, and Matt Mitrione) as part of a Toronto area anti-bullying program.

Championships and achievements

Mixed martial arts
 TKO Major League MMA
 TKO Major League Featherweight Championship
 Three successful title defenses
 Ultimate Fighting Championship
 Fight of the Night (Three times)
 Universal Combat Challenge
 Canadian Super-Lightweight Championship
 Four successful title defenses
 Sherdog
 2010 Round of the Year (2nd round in fight against Yves Jabouin)

Kickboxing
 International Sport Karate Association
 ISKA Canadian Super Welterweight Championship
 International Kickboxing Federation
 IKF North American Super Welterweight Championship

Mixed martial arts record

|-
| Loss
| align=center| 20–12
| Pablo Garza
| Decision (unanimous)
| UFC 154
| 
| align=center| 3
| align=center| 5:00
| Montreal, Quebec, Canada
|
|-
| Loss
| align=center| 20–11
| Eddie Yagin
| Decision (split)
| UFC 145
| 
| align=center| 3
| align=center| 5:00
| Atlanta, Georgia, United States
| 
|-
| Loss
| align=center| 20–10
| Chan-Sung Jung
| KO (punches)
| UFC 140
| 
| align=center| 1
| align=center| 0:07
| Toronto, Ontario, Canada
|
|-
| Loss
| align=center| 20–9
| José Aldo
| Decision (unanimous)
| UFC 129
| 
| align=center| 5
| align=center| 5:00
| Toronto, Ontario, Canada
| 
|-
| Win
| align=center| 20–8
| George Roop
| TKO (punches)
| UFC: Fight for the Troops 2
| 
| align=center| 1
| align=center| 1:28
| Fort Hood, Texas, United States
| 
|-
| Win
| align=center| 19–8
| Leonard Garcia
| Decision (split)
| WEC 51
| 
| align=center| 3
| align=center| 5:00
| Broomfield, Colorado, United States
|
|-
| Win
| align=center| 18–8
| Yves Jabouin
| TKO (punches)
| WEC 49
| 
| align=center| 2
| align=center| 3:21
| Edmonton, Alberta, Canada
| 
|-
| Win
| align=center| 17–8
| Bryan Caraway
| Submission (triangle armbar)
| WEC 46
| 
| align=center| 1
| align=center| 3:48
| Sacramento, California, United States
|
|-
| Win
| align=center| 16–8
| Savant Young
| Submission (armbar)
| Affliction: Banned
| 
| align=center| 2
| align=center| 4:25
| Anaheim, California, United States
|
|-
| Loss
| align=center| 15–8
| Josh Grispi
| Submission (rear-naked choke)
| WEC 32: Condit vs. Prater
| 
| align=center| 1
| align=center| 2:55
| Rio Rancho, New Mexico, United States
|
|-
| Win
| align=center| 15–7
| Danny Martinez
| Decision (unanimous)
| TKO 31: Young Guns
| 
| align=center| 3
| align=center| 5:00
| Montreal, Quebec, Canada
|
|-
| Win
| align=center| 14–7
| Ben Greer
| KO (punches)
| TKO 30: Apocalypse
| 
| align=center| 1
| align=center| 1:14
| Montreal, Quebec, Canada
|
|-
| Loss
| align=center| 13–7
| Rani Yahya
| Submission (rear-naked choke)
| WEC 28
| 
| align=center| 1
| align=center| 1:19
| Las Vegas, Nevada, United States
|
|-
| Loss
| align=center| 13–6
| Hatsu Hioki
| Decision (majority)
| TKO 28: Inevitable
| 
| align=center| 5
| align=center| 5:00
| Montreal, Quebec, Canada
| 
|-
| Win
| align=center| 13–5
| Doug Edwards
| Submission (rear-naked choke)
| ROF 27: Collision Course
| 
| align=center| 2
| align=center| 4:08
| Denver, Colorado, United States
|
|-
| Win
| align=center| 12–5
| Samuel Guillet
| Decision (unanimous)
| TKO 27: Reincarnation
| 
| align=center| 3
| align=center| 5:00
| Montreal, Quebec, Canada
|
|-
| Win
| align=center| 11–5
| Jorge Gurgel
| Decision (unanimous)
| UFC Fight Night 5
| 
| align=center| 3
| align=center| 5:00
| Las Vegas, Nevada, United States
|
|-
| Loss
| align=center| 10–5
| Hatsu Hioki
| Technical Submission (triangle choke)
| TKO 25: Confrontation
| 
| align=center| 2
| align=center| 5:00
| Montreal, Quebec, Canada
| 
|-
| Win
| align=center| 10–4
| Yves Edwards
| Submission (triangle armbar)
| UFC 58: USA vs. Canada
| 
| align=center| 2
| align=center| 1:52
| Las Vegas, Nevada, United States
|
|-
| Win
| align=center| 9–4
| Naoji Fujimoto
| Technical Submission (rear-naked choke)
| TKO 24: Eruption
| 
| align=center| 3
| align=center| 2:23
| Laval, Quebec, Canada
| 
|-
| Win
| align=center| 8–4
| Ryan Diaz
| TKO (punches)
| TKO 22: Lionheart
| 
| align=center| 3
| align=center| 4:25
| Montreal, Quebec, Canada
| 
|-
| Win
| align=center| 7–4
| Stephane Vigneault
| Submission (punches)
| TKO 20: Champion vs Champion
| 
| align=center| 1
| align=center| 4:35
| Montreal, Quebec, Canada
| 
|-
| Win
| align=center| 6–4
| Shane Rice
| TKO (leg kicks and punch)
| TKO 19: Rage
| 
| align=center| 1
| align=center| 4:16
| Montreal, Quebec, Canada
| 
|-
| Loss
| align=center| 5–4
| Shane Rice
| Submission (rear-naked choke)
| TKO 17: Revenge
| 
| align=center| 1
| align=center| 1:46
| Victoriaville, Quebec, Canada
| 
|-
| Win
| align=center| 5–3
| David Guigui
| TKO (punches)
| TKO 15: Unstoppable
| 
| align=center| 2
| align=center| 4:26
| Montreal, Quebec, Canada
| 
|-
| Win
| align=center| 4–3
| Ryan Diaz
| TKO (punches)
| TKO 13: Ultimate Rush
| 
| align=center| 2
| align=center| 0:42
| Montreal, Quebec, Canada
| 
|-
| Loss
| align=center| 3–3
| Tommy Lee
| TKO (slam)
| Extreme Challenge 51
| 
| align=center| 1
| align=center| 0:18
| St. Charles, Illinois, United States
|
|-
| Loss
| align=center| 3–2
| Mike Brown
| Submission (heel hook)
| TFC 8: Hell Raiser
| 
| align=center| 3
| align=center| 4:27
| Toledo, Ohio, United States
|
|-
| Loss
| align=center| 3–1
| Stephen Palling
| TKO (doctor stoppage)
| SuperBrawl 29
| 
| align=center| 1
| align=center| 0:16
| Honolulu, Hawaii, United States
| 
|-
| Win
| align=center| 3–0
| Stephane Laliberte
| Submission (armbar)
| UCC 12: Adrenaline
| 
| align=center| 1
| align=center| 4:43
| Montreal, Quebec, Canada
| 
|-
| Win
| align=center| 2–0
| Steve Claveau
| Submission (punches)
| UCC 11: The Next Level
| 
| align=center| 2
| align=center| 3:24
| Montreal, Quebec, Canada
| 
|-
| Win
| align=center| 1–0
| Richard Nancoo
| TKO (punches)
| UCC 10: Battle for the Belts 2002
| 
| align=center| 3
| align=center| 3:23
| Hull, Quebec, Canada
|

References

External links
 
 

1982 births
Living people
Canadian male mixed martial artists
Featherweight mixed martial artists
Lightweight mixed martial artists
Mixed martial artists utilizing boxing
Mixed martial artists utilizing Muay Thai
Canadian male kickboxers
Welterweight kickboxers
Canadian Muay Thai practitioners
Sportspeople from Ontario
People from Ingersoll, Ontario
Ultimate Fighting Championship male fighters